Lindsey Hopkins Sr. (April 22, 1879 - August 14, 1937) was an American businessman and philanthropist. He was both a major stockholder and a director of the Coca-Cola Company. In addition, he was a director at The Sperry Corp., North American Aviation (of which Eastern Airlines was a subsidiary), the Reynolds Metal Company, and several banks and insurance companies. His Metropolitan Miami real estate included business and hotel properties in Miami, Coral Gables, and Miami Beach.

Early life
Lindsey Hopkins Sr. was born at Reidsville, North Carolina on April 22, 1879. His parents were Jonathan and Minerva Jones Hopkins. After attending public schools, he attended the University of North Carolina and in 1908 married Leonora Balsley of Greensboro.

Hopkins started out as a printer’s devil with the Greensboro Patriot making $2 a week, graduated quickly to selling oil, and soon displayed a knack for making vast sums of money by investing in new ventures.

Business life
“When in doubt, take a chance” was his motto and Lindsey Hopkins Sr. lived by it. In 1905, as a promotional stunt, he drove a car 400 miles over muddy roads and swollen rivers from Atlanta, Georgia, to Greensboro, North Carolina, in 5 and a half days, with near-fatal mishaps along the way. In 1909 Lindsey Hopkins Sr. moved to Atlanta from Greensboro to engage in business in the fledgling automobile, oil, and gasoline industry. He made a fortune selling Overland automobiles, becoming a distributor in nine Southern states, and took an active interest in the Good Roads Movement. 

Hopkins promptly squandered that fortune by gambling prematurely on commercial aviation. He bought a Curtiss biplane in 1911 (one of the first private planes in Atlanta), flew the first piece of airmail into Atlanta, sponsored the first air meet at Candler Field, and soon went broke. (He would later travel from Germany to the US on the second North American trip of the Zeppelin Hindenburg as a passenger.) By 1916, he had recouped his losses, and then began playing the market in cotton, railroads, rubber and shipping, amassing a fortune of several million dollars.

Miami
Lindsey Hopkins Sr. was the owner of the Shoreland Arcade, one of Miami's principal commercial structures fronting on E. Flagler Street, N.E. First Street, and N.E. First Avenue. In addition to being a stockholder in the Carl G. Fisher hotel chain operating in Florida and New York, he owned 98 houses and cottages in Miami. Mr. Hopkins also had an interest in the 17-story Columbus Hotel at Biscayne boulevard and N.E. First Street with S.A. Lynch.

Mr. Hopkins was also the director of the Bureau of Supplies at a time when, in his words, “the world’s markets and the transportation facilities of the United States perhaps have never been as greatly demoralized as now.” In 1917 he responded by letter to a request from a Mrs. Moore, who complained that she had been trying to obtain wool for more than two months. Because of a lack of supplies, the order couldn’t be fulfilled completely, Mr. Hopkins explained: “Bear in mind that this situation exists, but that we are doing everything possible to increase the efficiency of the service.”

At the time of his death at 57 years old, Hopkins was perhaps the largest individual owner of valuable Metropolitan Miami real estate, investing great sums in real properties throughout the last few years before his passing.

Roosevelt Hotel (Lindsey Hopkins Technical College)

The construction of the Roosevelt Hotel was started by Fred Rand, far out on the other end of his Second Avenue business strip, at Fourteenth street. It was slated to be a $2,750,000 hotel with 560 rooms. However, the Roosevelt Hotel Project was left unfinished in 1926, and its unfinished walls and rude interior furnished a haven for hobos and the homeless for 10 years, while two hurricanes did their unsuccessful best to ruin it.

The structure was bought in January 1936 for $38,000 by Lindsey Hopkins, Sr., and his associates, Oscar E. Dooley and his son, Lindsey Hopkins, Jr., to both repair and finish. Over one million dollars was spent to complete the Roosevelt Hotel.

Upon the passing of Lindsey Hopkins Sr., the building was sold for only $225,000 dollars to the Miami Dade Public Schools by Lindsey Hopkins Jr. in honor of his father and thus was named the Lindsey Hopkins Vocational School. It is now known as Lindsey Hopkins Technical College.  At the time of the sale, the Roosevelt Hotel had an appraised value of one million dollars.

Coral Gables
Lindsey Hopkins Sr. financed and owned the San Sebastian Hotel in Coral Gables, Florida. He made his winter home in the city for several years. Later the hotel was acquired by the University of Miami for $200,000. The building would be used as a residence hall for women students, and it would provide apartments for some faculty members and quarters for nine sororities.

Mr. Hopkins was also responsible for building 100 homes in Coral Gables using The American Building Company of Cincinnati, Ohio, the same company used by Coral Gables developer George E. Merrick. He was also a member of the Century Club of Coral Gables.

Atlanta
Lindsey Hopkins' holdings also included much real estate in Atlanta, Georgia, where for several years he maintained a home on the city's fashionable Peachtree street.

Coca-Cola Company
When Coca Cola stock was at a low point in 1921, Hopkins started buying, and by the spring of 1928 he was a major shareholder. However, his path to success was not smooth. In the words of a friend, Hopkins had a “divine spark of push, go-aheadness, and an acquisitive spirit that would broach no stopping.” Hopkins believed the Coca-Cola company had barely scratched the surface of the possibilities before it,” and he was pretty sure Ernest Woodruff was trying to sell it short. He meant to stop him. 

As Frederick Allen tells in his book “Secret Formula,” about how Coca-Cola became a worldwide brand, “On April 9, 1928, Hopkins leaked a story to the Associated Press in New York disclosing his role as the investor who had been buying Coca-Cola stock and pushing up its price. Then he walked into the main branch of Chase National Bank in New York, signed a six-month note and borrowed $1 million in cash so he could buy more. For the next three weeks, he and the Woodruffs fought a desperate battle over the future of the company. Ernest and Robert and their allies at Trust Company launched a new round of short sales, hoping to depress the price of the stock, while Hopkins spent his million dollars buying up their positions and keeping the value high.”

Philanthropy
One of the major philanthropies of Lindsey Hopkins Sr. was the donation of his Atlanta mansion and its spacious grounds to the Peachtree Church of Atlanta for a parsonage. He followed this gift shortly with a donation of $100,000 to Emory University in Atlanta. That gift was one of the largest ever made to Atlanta charities as of 1930s. The money was going to be used for development of Emory University medical department’s facilities and for the erection of a home for the Good Samaritan Clinic. Moreover, having been the product of public schools, he was a big supporter of public education.

Death
Lindsey Hopkins Sr. died in Georgia metropolis on August 14, 1937, after an illness of about 10 days. According to physicians, heart disease was the reason for his death.

Eddie Rickenbacker, who was a pallbearer at the Lindsey Hopkins' funeral said, "He made friends wherever he went and I am proud to say that our friendship has been more than 20 years' standing.  He had friends everywhere because his interests were so wide that he numbered his friends in all walks of life."

Mr. Hopkins’ death was constituted as a community loss, as he was an important philanthropist. He made many contributions to the prosperity of Florida. Minister Dr. Bricker, at Hopkins' funeral, said was a “man who did good in secret.”

References

Further reading

Pendergrast, Mark, For God, Country, and Coca Cola, Basic Books, 2000. .

American businesspeople
American philanthropists
1879 births
1937 deaths